Aucará District is one of twenty-one districts of the Lucanas Province in Peru.

Geography 
Other mountains are listed below:

Ethnic groups 
The people in the district are mainly indigenous citizens of Quechua descent. Quechua is the language which the majority of the population (52.65%) learnt to speak in childhood, 47.04% of the residents started speaking using the Spanish language (2007 Peru Census).

See also 
 Hatun Misapata
 Quchapampa
 Q'asa Pata
 T'urpuqucha
 Usqunta

References